Cill Chiaráin (anglicized as Kilkieran) is a coastal village in the Connemara area of County Galway in Ireland. The R340 passes through Cill Chiaráin.

Cill Chiaráin lies in a Gaeltacht region (Irish-speaking area), and Coláiste Sheoisaimh hosts Irish language courses within the village.

Name
The village is named after Saint Ciarán, "Cill Chiaráin" translates to "Ciarán's church" from Irish. It shares its name with a second Cill Chiaráin in County Kilkenny.

History
On St Ciarán's feast day, there is a Pattern Day in honour of the saint held in the village. Organised by the local festival committee, Coiste Fhéile Chill Chiaráin, there is a Roman Catholic Mass performed at the well which St Ciarán blessed back in the 6th century.

Amenities
Cill Chiaráin has a number of facilities and public buildings, including a health centre, a "gastropub" (Tigh Chadhain), local supermarket, a national school, community hall, church and fish factory.

The Arramara Teo seaweed factory is also nearby. The company was previously Irish owned, but has since been bought by a Canadian company.

The village also has a children's playground and the Páirc Peile Chill Chiaráin (artificial pitch) which opened in 2015. The pitch is used by the local GAA team, Carna-Cashel, and the athletics club.

See also
 List of towns and villages in Ireland

References

Towns and villages in County Galway
Gaeltacht places in County Galway
Gaeltacht towns and villages